The 2007 Formula Renault 2.0 UK Championship was the 19th British Formula Renault Championship season. The season began at Brands Hatch on March 31 and finished at Thruxton on October 14, after twenty rounds. The championship was won by Duncan Tappy with Adam Christodoulou winning the Graduate Cup.

Teams and drivers

Calendar
All races held in United Kingdom.

Championship standings
Points are awarded to the drivers as follows:

Best 18 results count towards the championship.
 T. Pts—points if all races counted.
 Drop—two dropped scores.
 Pts—best 18 results.
 G. Pts—drivers in the Graduate Cup, with the best 15 results counting.

 (1) = Points include all drivers results except fastest laps extra points.

References

External links
 The official website of the Formula Renault UK Championship

UK
Formula Renault UK season
Renault 2.0 UK